On February 5, 1982, a Republic of Korea Air Force Fairchild C-123J crashed while on approach to Jeju International Airport, Jeju, South Korea.  All 47 passengers and 6 crew were killed in the impact.  It remains the fourth-worst accident in South Korean aviation history.  The aircraft was engaged in a training mission and encountered bad weather before crashing near to Mount Halla, a dormant volcano.

The 47 soldiers belonged to the army's elite 707th Special Mission Battalion, making the accident the single costliest day in the unit's history.

References

Aviation accidents and incidents in 1982
Aviation accidents and incidents in South Korea
1982 in South Korea
Accidents and incidents involving military aircraft
Republic of Korea Air Force
February 1982 events in Asia